Claude Brasseur (15 June 1936 – 22 December 2020) was a French actor.

Life and career
Claude Brasseur was born in Neuilly-sur-Seine as Claude Pierre Espinasse, the son of actor Pierre Brasseur and actress Odette Joyeux. He was the godson of Ernest Hemingway and the father of Alexandre Brasseur.

He was a member of the French bobsleigh team in the 60s and also a winning Paris-Dakar rally competitor, as co-pilot of Jacky Ickx.

From the late 1950s until two years before his death, Brasseur appeared in overall 150 film and television productions. One of his film roles was as Arthur in Jean-Luc Godard's Bande à part (1964). Brasseur played the title role in the early 1970s historical crime television series The New Adventures of Vidocq. A big commercial success were the comedies La Boum (1980) and La Boum 2 (1982), in which he played the father of Sophie Marceau's teenage character.

He died on 22 December 2020, at the age of 84.

Accolades

Selected filmography

References

External links
 

1936 births
2020 deaths
People from Neuilly-sur-Seine
Chevaliers of the Légion d'honneur
French male bobsledders
French rally drivers
French male stage actors
French rally co-drivers
French male film actors
French male television actors
Best Actor César Award winners
Best Supporting Actor César Award winners
20th-century French male actors
21st-century French male actors
Sportspeople from Hauts-de-Seine